The 1970 New Mexico gubernatorial election took place on November 3, 1970, in order to elect the Governor of New Mexico. Due to term limits, incumbent Republican David Cargo was ineligible to seek a third term as governor. This election was the first in which the governor was elected for a four-year term. Prior to this, the governor was elected to a two-year term, renewable once.

Democratic primary
The Democratic primary was won by state representative Bruce King.

Campaign
A major issue in the election was how the University of New Mexico should deal with anti-war protesters. Defenders of the University did so on the grounds of free speech, and opponents argued on the grounds of law and order.

Jack Daniels ran as a moderate liberal candidate, and he became the strongest defender of the University of New Mexico throughout the campaign. King was the other moderate liberal candidate, and he and Daniels agreed on most issues, with them both supporting the University of New Mexico. However, Daniels was more vigorous in his support, constantly advertising and emphasizing that he supported the University's position, while King mostly avoided the issue.  On the other hand, Alexander Sceresse attacked the University, calling for law and order. The Democratic primary had above-average turnout, with 54% voting, and King beat Daniels 49%–37%, with Sceresse only getting 14% of the vote. Bruce King then went on to become Governor of New Mexico.

Results

Republican primary
The Republican primary was won by Mayor of Albuquerque Pete Domenici.

Results

General election

Results

References

1970
gubernatorial
New Mexico
November 1970 events in the United States